NN (Spanish: NN: Sin identidad) is a 2014 internationally co-produced drama film directed by Héctor Gálvez. The film was selected as the Peruvian entry for the Best Foreign Language Film at the 88th Academy Awards but it was not nominated.

Cast
 Paul Vega
 Antonieta Pari
 Isabel Gaona
 Lucho Cáceres
 Gonzalo Molina
 Manuel Gold
 Amiel Cayo
 Fiorella Díaz
 Andrea Pacheco

See also
 List of submissions to the 88th Academy Awards for Best Foreign Language Film
 List of Peruvian submissions for the Academy Award for Best Foreign Language Film

References

External links
 

2014 films
2014 drama films
Peruvian drama films

Colombian drama films
German drama films
French drama films
2010s Spanish-language films
2010s Peruvian films
2010s German films
2010s French films